Ottokar Runze (19 August 1925 – 22 September 2018) was a German film producer, director and screenwriter. His 1974 film In the Name of the People was entered into the 24th Berlin International Film Festival, where it won the Silver Bear. The following year, he was a member of the jury at the 25th Berlin International Film Festival.

Selected filmography
 Five Suspects (dir. Kurt Hoffmann, 1950, producer)
  (1972) — loosely based on Shakespeare's Twelfth Night
  (1974)
 In the Name of the People (1974)
  (1975)
 A Lost Life (1976)
 The Standard (1977) — based on The Standard by Alexander Lernet-Holenia
  (1979) — based on a novel by Georges Simenon
 High Society Limited (1982)
  (1983)
  (1986–1988, TV series)
 Der veruntreute Himmel (1990, TV film) — based on a novel by Franz Werfel
  (1990)
 Linda (1992)
 Goldstaub (1993, TV film)
 Tatort: Laura, mein Engel (1994, TV series episode)
 100 Jahre Brecht (1998) — based on works by Bertolt Brecht
 The Volcano (1999) — based on a novel by Klaus Mann

References

External links

1925 births
2018 deaths
Mass media people from Berlin
Silver Bear for Best Director recipients